Randall High School is a public high school located in the city limits of Amarillo, Texas (US). It is part of the Canyon Independent School District located in north central Randall County and classified as a 4A school by the UIL. In 2015, the school was rated "Met Standard" by the Texas Education Agency.

Facilities and athletics

Campus Facilities

West Building
Includes classrooms, offices, library, student commons, two basketball courts, and auditorium.
East Building
Includes classrooms, offices, library, cafeteria, basketball court, and turf room.
Industry Building
Includes classrooms and shops for various specialized classes such as architecture and agriculture.
Athletic Facilities
Football/soccer field, baseball and softball diamonds, 14 tennis courts, weight room, trainers facility, wrestling complex, field house.

Athletics

The Randall Raiders compete in the following sports - 

Cross Country, Volleyball, Football, Basketball, Wrestling, Soccer, Powerlifting, Golf, Tennis, Track, Softball & Baseball, Bowling.

Happy State Bank Stadium serves as Randall's home football venue.

State titles
Girls Basketball - 
1992(4A), 1998(4A)
Boys Cross Country - 
1988(4A), 1989(4A)
Girls Cross Country - 
2013(4A), 2014(5A), 2016(5A)
Volleyball - 
2009(4A), 2022(4A)
Boys Wrestling - 
2008(All), 2009(All) 2013(4A) 2018(4A) 2019(4A) 2020(4A) 2021(4A)

Notable alumni 

 Aaron Watson, Country Music Singer and Songwriter
 Heston Kjerstad, professional baseball outfielder for Baltimore Orioles
 [ Alyssa Ballard ], Olympic weightlifter 2x Youth world silver medalist, pan American champion

References

External links
Canyon ISD

Schools in Randall County, Texas
Public high schools in Texas
Canyon Independent School District